The Short Admiralty Type 74 was a single-engined biplane tractor seaplane with non-folding wings, which saw service with the Royal Naval Air Service during the First World War.

Design and development
The Type 74 incorporated some of the innovations Horace Short had introduced to the Short Admiralty Type 42, including manganese-steel tube struts instead of wood. In addition to the two main rubber-sprung floats below the fuselage and the single tail float, it also had smaller floats attached below the lower wingtips. Ailerons were mounted on the upper wing only, the latter extending beyond the span of the lower wing. The extensions were braced by diagonal struts to the lower wingtips.

Since it was intended for use as a coastal patrol seaplane operating from coastal stations, there was no requirement for the Type 74 to have folding wings.

The Type 74 was powered by a 100 hp (74.6 kW) Gnome double Omega engine, which provided a maximum flight duration of five hours.

Operational history
In 1913 the Royal Navy ordered seven 100 hp biplane seaplanes from Shorts, which were assigned the company's serial numbers 69-75. The first of these flew on 4 January 1914, piloted by Gordon Bell, Chief Test Pilot at Shorts. He was accompanied on this first flight by Charles Richard Fairey (later Sir Richard Fairey), who left Shorts in 1915 to found the Fairey Aviation company.
When this first aircraft was delivered to the Royal Navy air station on the Isle of Grain it received the Navy's serial number 74, so this and the remaining six aircraft from the batch (Navy numbers 74-80) were therefore known as the Admiralty Type 74 according to the rules in use at the  time.

Of the seven aircraft, four (including Naval nos. 75 and 79) were dispatched to the air station at Dundee, the other three remaining at the Grain air station. The Dundee aircraft took part in the 1914 Royal Fleet Review off Spithead as part of a contingent of 17 seaplanes and four airships.

Operators

Royal Naval Air Service

Specifications

References

Further reading
 
 
 
 

1910s British military reconnaissance aircraft
Floatplanes
Biplanes
Admiralty
Rotary-engined aircraft
Single-engined tractor aircraft
Aircraft first flown in 1914